Sheung Cheung Wai is a walled village in the Ping Shan area of Yuen Long District, in Hong Kong. It is part of the Ping Shan Heritage Trail.

Administration
Sheung Cheung Wai is a recognized village under the New Territories Small House Policy. It is one of the 37 villages represented within the Ping Shan Rural Committee. For electoral purposes, Sheung Cheung Wai is part of the Ping Shan Central constituency.

History
Sheung Cheung Wai is one of the three wais (walled villages) and six tsuens (villages) established by the Tang Clan of Ping Shan, namely: Sheung Cheung Wai, Kiu Tau Wai, Fui Sha Wai, Hang Tau Tsuen, Hang Mei Tsuen, Tong Fong Tsuen, San Tsuen, Hung Uk Tsuen and San Hei Tsuen.

It was built about 200 years ago by a line of the Tang Clan that branched out from nearby Hang Tau Tsuen.

At the time of the 1911 census, the population of Sheung Cheung Wai was 119. The number of males was 52.

Features
The moat that once surrounded the village has been filled. Three of the original watchtowers have collapsed and only the lower storey of the southwest one remains, which has been converted for residential use.

Conservation
Sheung Cheung Wai is the only walled village along the Ping Shan Heritage Trail.

See also
 Walled villages of Hong Kong

References

External links

 Delineation of area of existing village Sheung Cheung Wai (Ping Shan) for election of resident representative (2019 to 2022)
 Antiquities and Monuments Office. Hong Kong Traditional Chinese Architectural Information System. Sheung Cheung Wai
 Antiquities Advisory Board. Pictures of Entrance Gate, Sheung Cheung Wai, Ping Shan
 Antiquities Advisory Board. Historic Building Appraisal. Shrine, Sheung Cheung Wai, Ping Shan Pictures
 Antiquities Advisory Board. Historic Building Appraisal. Yeung Hau Temple, Sheung Cheung Wai, Ping Shan Pictures

Walled villages of Hong Kong
Ping Shan
Villages in Yuen Long District, Hong Kong